In mathematics, the Saito–Kurokawa lift (or lifting) takes elliptic modular forms to Siegel modular forms of degree 2.

Statement
The Saito–Kurokawa lift σk takes level 1 modular forms f of weight 2k − 2 to level 1 Siegel modular forms of degree 2 and weight k. The L-functions (when f is a Hecke eigenforms) are related by L(s,σk(f)) = ζ(s − k + 2)ζ(s − k + 1)L(s, f).

The Saito–Kurokawa lift can be constructed as the composition of the following three mappings:
 The Shimura correspondence from level 1 modular forms of weight 2k − 2 to a space of level 4 modular forms of weight k − 1/2 in the Kohnen plus-space.
A map from the Kohnen plus-space to the space of Jacobi forms of index 1 and weight k, studied by Eichler and Zagier.
 A map from the space of Jacobi forms of index 1 and weight k to the Siegel modular forms of degree 2, introduced by Maass.

The Saito–Kurokawa lift can be generalized to forms of higher level.

The image is the Spezialschar (special band), the space of Siegel modular forms whose Fourier coefficients satisfy

See also

Doi–Naganuma lifting, a similar lift to Hilbert modular forms.
Ikeda lift, a generalization to Siegel modular forms of higher degree.

References

 

 

Modular forms